The Western Collegiate Hockey League (WCHL) is a Division 1 collegiate ice hockey league in the ACHA, which is the highest non-varsity Club Level for college hockey. The ACHL is made up of ten teams from the Western United States.

History 
In 2012, the WCHL was created and played its first season in the ACHA in 2013-14 with six founding member teams. Arizona, Arizona State, Central Oklahoma, and Oklahoma joined the league after competing as ACHA D-1 Independent programs.  Those four teams, joined Colorado and Colorado State, who made the transition to from ACHA D-2 to ACHA D-1.

In the WCHL's first two years of competition, they won back-to-back ACHA D-1 National Championships, which was hosted at the Comerica Center in Frisco, Texas for the 2019 and 2020 seasons.

In 2013–14, Arizona State defeated Robert Morris for the 2013–14 ACHA D-1 National Championship.
And in 2014–15, Central Oklahoma defeated Stony Brook for the 2014–15 ACHA D-1 National Championship.

During the 2014 season, Arizona State announced their departure from the WCHL D-1 Club Level and established a formal NCAA D-1 ice hockey program for the 2015–16 season. This move left the WCHL with five members until the league announced the additions of Arkansas who created a new ACHA D-1 hockey club after years of success at the ACHA D-3 level, and Missouri State who moved up from the ACHA D-2 level on January 12, 2015.

Not to be confused, Arizona State's NCAA D-1 team is the only Independent men's hockey team in the country, but ASU also maintains both ACHA Club Level teams with our WCHL D-1 Sun Devils, and the PAC-8 D-2 Sun Devils, respectively.

In 2017, Central Oklahoma won their 2nd ACHA D-1 National Championship after defeating Ohio University.

Subsequently, Arkansas left the WCHL after the 2018–19 season, and (currently) no longer has a D-1 hockey club.

Expansion
In September 2019, the WCHL expanded from seven to ten teams with the addition of University of Utah, UNLV, and Grand Canyon University for the 2020–21 season.

Format
With ten member schools in the conference, beginning in the 2020–21 season, the WCHL is now divided into two geographic divisions for conference play.  Each WCHL team will play a home-and-home series against every conference member within its division, as well as one home series and one road series against conference members from the opposite division, for a total of 20 WCHL conference games per season.

Potential expansion candidates
The West Division: BYU Hockey, if they're willing to part ways with the Mountain West Collegiate Hockey League and elevate to D-1 competition. And Utah State University, if Grand Canyon decides to dropped down to D-2 competition.

The East Division: The University of Northern Colorado who are the 2017, 2018, and 2019 champions of the Big Mountain Hockey Conference at the ACHA D-2 level.

Conference divisions

Current Teams

Conference Arenas

ACHL Conference Champions

a * The Coronavirus pandemic prematurely ended the 2019–2020 regular season.

ACHA D-1 National Champions

References

External links
Official WCHL website
Arizona Wildcats
Arizona State Sun Devils
Central Oklahoma Bronchos
Colorado Buffaloes
Colorado State Rams
Grand Canyon Antelopes
Missouri State Ice Bears
Oklahoma Sooners
UNLV Rebels
Utah Utes

See also
 American Collegiate Hockey Association
 List of ice hockey leagues

ACHA Division 1 conferences
2012 establishments in the United States